The Sourdough Mountains, also called Sourdough Ridge, is a mountain ridge on the northeast side of Mount Rainier in Mount Rainier National Park, Washington, United States. The range forms an L-shape, starting at Mount Fremont, running east to Dege Peak, turning north to Slide Mountain.

The ridge is a popular hiking destination, due to the excellent view of Mount Rainier and its proximity to roads and the Sunrise Visitor Center.

References

External links

Ridges of Washington (state)
Mount Rainier National Park